Michael Balac (born 3 August 1988) is an English former first-class cricketer. He is a right-handed batsman and wicket-keeper who played once for Warwickshire County Cricket Club. He was born in Nuneaton.

Balac's cricketing career started in the Cockspur Cup, representing Leamington between 2005 and 2007. Having made a Second XI appearance for Warwickshire in 2008, he made his debut first-class appearance against Bangladesh A in July having been registered especially as a player with the England and Wales Cricket Board to replace the rested Tony Frost and injured Richard Johnson, Warwickshire's two professional wicket-keepers at the time. He took two catches in the first innings and four in the second innings.

References

External links

1988 births
Living people
English cricketers
Warwickshire cricketers
People from Nuneaton
English cricketers of the 21st century
Wicket-keepers